Arkansas Highway 172 (AR 172, Ark. 172, and Hwy. 172) is a designation for a state highway in Southern Arkansas. The first section begins at US Route 82 (US 82) in Cairo and ends at AR 7 in Smackover. The second section begins at US 167 near Artesian and ends at AR 160 just west of Jersey. The third, and longest, section begins at US 278 east of Warren and ends at US 425 south of Monticello. All three routes are very rural.

Route description

Union County route 

The route heads northeast, intersecting the community of Lisbon along the way, before ending at AR 7 in Smackover.

Calhoun County route 

The route heads east, before ending at AR 160 just northwest of Jersey about  later. The route does not intersect any other highways.

Bradley and Drew County Route 

The western terminus of AR 172 begins at US 278 east of Warren. The route heads south, before eventually making a large U-turn in southwestern Drew County. The route continues to head northeast, passing through the community of New Hope before eventually ending at U.S. Route 425 south of Monticello.

Major intersections

References

External links

172
Transportation in Union County, Arkansas
Transportation in Calhoun County, Arkansas
Transportation in Bradley County, Arkansas
Transportation in Drew County, Arkansas